Sogdian Daēnās, also known as Sogdian Deities is a 10th-century line drawing discovered by the French Orientalist Paul Pelliot at the Mogao Caves. It was painted during the late Tang dynasty and the Five Dynasties and Ten Kingdoms period, and is probably associated with the Zoroastrian cult of the Sogdian people. The historian , who is a member of the Academia Sinica of Taiwan, recognised this "paper image" as one of the "pieces of paper depicting Mazdean deities for the  celebration". The drawing is preserved in the Bibliothèque nationale de France in Paris.

Description 
This sketch, painted on paper in black ink with light colouring, depicts two ladies sitting opposite each another, their heads being encircled by nimbi. Both are represented holding various attributes: the lady on the left, who sits on a rectangular throne supported by a row of lotus petals, holds a foliated cup and a tray with a dog seated on it. The one on the right is seated on a dog or wolf, and has four arms, the upper two supporting the sun and moon discs, the lower two arms holding a scorpion and a snake. They wear a characteristic hairstyle, surmounted by a water-drop-shaped or peach-shaped headdresses that are probably made of metal.

Analysis 

The drawing had been published in Jao Tsung-I's The Line Drawing of Dunhuang in 1978, but has only attracted the interest of researchers since it was displayed in the Sérinde exhibition in 1995.

The peach-shaped headdress resembles the hairstyle of the Uyghur princess. The dress of the lady on the left, at least, does not seem to correspond to the Chinese fashion at the time, and both representing the expression of foreign beliefs.

Frantz Grenet—a French specialist on Sogdiana and Zoroastrianism—and the historian Zhang Guangda argue that the lady on the left representing Daēnā, the good according to Zoroastrian vision; the other one represents Daēva, the bad. Jiang Boqin agrees with Grenet and Zhang that the deity on the left being Daēnā, but he determined the one on the right is the goddess Nanâ.

See also 
 Xianshenlou
 Viśa Īrasangä
 Zoroastrianism in China
 Nestorian pillar of Luoyang
 Ancient Arts of Central Asia

Notes

References

External links 
 Pelliot chinois 4518 (24) : Deux divinités féminines at  

Ancient Central Asian art
Sogdians
Zoroastrianism
Drawings of people
Tang dynasty paintings
Five Dynasties and Ten Kingdoms
Spiritual and religious images
Bibliothèque nationale de France collections
Deities in art